Plakortis dariae is a species of sea sponge in the order Homosclerophorida, first found in vertical walls of reef caves at depths of about  in the Caribbean Sea. This species has diods of two different categories: it possesses large ones (measuring 67–112μm long) and small, rare, irregular, curved ones, which are often deformed with one of its ends being blunt (measuring 30–59μm long); triods are rare and regular (actines measuring 20–44μm long).

References

Further reading

Homoscleromorpha
Animals described in 2014